The National Intelligence Agency of Somaliland (NIA) is Somaliland's intelligence agency, established in 2012 by President Ahmed Mohamed Mohamoud    and approved by the Parliament of Somaliland in 2013. The head of the agency is the Director General and is appointed by the president, the current head is Osman Limo.

See also
 Politics of Somaliland
 Somaliland Police
 State Printing Agency

References

Government agencies of Somaliland
2012 establishments in Somaliland